Abderrazak El Albani is a French-Moroccan sedimentologist, Professor at University of Poitiers at the Hydrasa laboratory (IC2MP - CNRS).  He is significant for having discovered the oldest known fossils of multicellular organisms in the 2.1 billion year-old black shales of the Paleoproterozoic Francevillian Group Fossil Formation in Gabon, which shed new light on the origin of multicellular organisms.

Biography 
French-Moroccan geologist, born in Marrakesh, he studied in the University of Lille, from which he received a doctorate after defending a thesis on geology and sedimentary geochemistry. Between 1996 and 1998, he spent a postdoctoral period at the University of Kiel, in Germany. He published several scientific articles on Paleo-environments, Geobiology and Diagenesis in sedimentary basins. He then joined the Hydrasa laboratory (University of Poitiers – CNRS) in 1999. He was appointed Professor in 2010.

Major discovery 
In 2008, A. El Albani was the head of an international team which discovered fossil and multicellular forms of life at the macro-scale in a fossiliferous site situated in the province of Haut Ogooué in Gabon. In July 2010, this research work made the cover of the scientific magazine Nature. The study of these fossils disclosed the emergence of a multicellular, complex and organized life in Precambrian rocks as old as 2.1 billion years. The discovery of these organisms moved back the date of the emergence of multicellular life by 1.5 billion years. This discovery has also increased our current knowledge of the evolution of the biosphere on Earth.

References

External links 
 El Albani Abderrazak, IC2MP

Books 

El Albani, A., Macchiarelli, R., Meunier, A. 2016. Aux origines de la vie - une nouvelle histoire de l'évolution. Dunod Paris, 224 pp., many b/w pictures in the text, 8 tables of color photos. .

Troppenz, U.-M., Schmälzle, D. 2015. Wohin die Spuren führen - das neue Bild des Präkambriums: Franceville-, Montana und Ediacarafauna. Tetrada Parchim, 192 pp., 162 photos, 2 time tables. .

Troppenz, U.-M. 2017. The New Precambrian - no "boring", but bustling billions in a succession of evolutions and global catastrophes. Tetrada Parchim, 140 pp., 115 photos, 2 time tables. .

Living people
French geologists
Academic staff of the University of Poitiers
Geobiologists
Lille University of Science and Technology alumni
Year of birth missing (living people)